Fiancée for Hire (Swedish: Fästmö uthyres) is a 1950 Swedish comedy film directed by Gustaf Molander and starring Olof Winnerstrand, Karl-Arne Holmsten and Eva Dahlbeck. It was shot at the Råsunda Studios in Stockholm. The film's sets were designed by the art director Nils Svenwall.

Cast
 Olof Winnerstrand as 	Fredrik Winkler
 Karl-Arne Holmsten as 	Allan Winkler
 Eva Dahlbeck as 	Margit Berg
 Dagmar Ebbesen as 	Ms. Lauritz
 Elsa Carlsson as Mrs. Winkler
 Barbro Hiort af Ornäs as 	Gertrud Stenström
 Jan Molander as 	Mårtensson
 Marianne Löfgren as 	Mrs. Pålman
 Stig Järrel as Major Pålman
 Thor Modéen as 	The Colonel
 Gunnar Björnstrand as Actor Julius Brumse
 Douglas Håge as 	Boström
 Viveca Serlachius as	Ann-Marie
 Carl-Olof Alm as 	Hellman
 Gull Natorp as	Countess Rosenskiöld
 Hans Järrsten as 	Åke Winkler
 Sven-Axel Carlsson as 	Vike - Errand Boy

References

Bibliography 
 Qvist, Per Olov & von Bagh, Peter. Guide to the Cinema of Sweden and Finland. Greenwood Publishing Group, 2000.

External links 
 

1950 films
Swedish comedy films
1950 comedy films
1950s Swedish-language films
Films directed by Gustaf Molander
Swedish black-and-white films
1950s Swedish films